The XPeng G9 is a battery-powered mid-sized luxury SUV manufactured by Chinese electric car company XPeng. The G9 was unveiled in November 2021 during the Guangzhou Auto Show and is scheduled to be officially launched in China in the third quarter of 2022. The G9 is the first XPeng product to be conceived and designed from the outset for both domestic Chinese and international markets.

Technical details 

The XPeng G9 is XPeng's 4th product, following the XPeng G3 compact crossover, XPeng P7 mid-size sedan, and XPeng P5 compact sedan. The G9 complies with 5-star safety design standards under new car assessment programs in China and the European Union, as well as the EU's vehicle certification standards known as European Whole Vehicle Type Approval, making the vehicle the first XPeng model to be designed with foreign markets in mind. The G9 also meets the EU's environmental protection requirements, with a reusability rate of more than 85 percent and a recyclable rate exceeding 95 percent, according to XPeng.

The XPeng G9 is equipped with the centralized electronic and electrical architecture of XPeng and Xpilot 4.0 advanced driver-assistance system in terms of advanced driver-assistance system (ADAS). The G9 is built on two Nvidia Drive Orin systems-on-a-chip capable of 508 trillion operations per second and delivers AI capabilities that Xmart OS could be continuously upgraded with each over-the-air update. It has the hardware capable of L4 autonomous driving. The G9 uses an 8 million pixel front-view camera and 2.9 million pixel cameras to cover the left and right sides of the vehicle as well as the front and rear views, with lidar sensors embedded in the headlights.

Specifically, the XPeng G9 aims to compete directly against models such as the Tesla Model X, the Nio ES7 and the Li Auto One from Li Auto (based on the wheelbase, 3,000–3,100 mm will be directly competitive for Nio ES8 3,010 mm and Li Auto One 3,010 mm). It can be seen as the flagship medium- to large- sized luxury SUV. It is similar in price to Tesla Model Y, but larger in size.

See also 
 List of production battery electric vehicles

References 

All-wheel-drive vehicles
Cars introduced in 2021
Luxury crossover sport utility vehicles
Production electric cars
Rear-wheel-drive vehicles
Sport utility vehicles
G9